Pingvin Island is a small island lying off the northwest side of the West Ice Shelf in Antarctica. It was first mapped by the 1956–57 Soviet expedition, who named it Pingvin (the Russian word for "Penguin"). Although it appears on most modern maps, according to some sources the island does not exist.

References

Islands of Princess Elizabeth Land